Sean Dougherty is a Canadian astrophysicist who has been involved in a large number of radio astronomical facilities, both Canadian and international.

Dougherty obtained a degree in mathematics and physics from the University of Nottingham in 1983, and after that he pursued a doctorate in astrophysics at the University of Calgary, where he obtained his Ph.D. in 1993.

Dougherty has more than 20 years of expertise in radio astronomy, managing and representing Canadian contributions to international radio astronomical facilities, and also research and development projects.

Dougherty has also led the construction and delivery of the WIDAR correlator to the Karl G. Jansky Very Large Array (JVLA). He also led an international consortium that designed the correlator (Central Signal Processor) of the Square Kilometre Array (SKA) Phase 1 mid-frequency telescope (SKA1-Mid).

Dougherty was selected for the position of ALMA Director in July 2017 for a five year period, starting February 21, 2018.

Dougherty was previously the director of the Dominion Radio Astrophysical Observatory (DRAO), the national facility for radio astronomy of Canada. DRAO is administrated by the NRC Herzberg Astronomy and Astrophysics. He was a member of the ALMA Board representing the North American executive for four years, and has been the president for the ALMA Budget Committee for the last two years.

References

Living people
Year of birth missing (living people)
Place of birth missing (living people)
Canadian astrophysicists
Alumni of the University of Nottingham
University of Calgary alumni
Radio astronomers